Ranchos de Taos is a census-designated place (CDP) in Taos County, New Mexico. The population was 2,390 at the time of the 2000 census.

The historic district is the Ranchos de Taos Plaza, which includes the San Francisco de Asis Mission Church.

History

In 1725, the settlement that was originally called Las Trampas de Taos became the permanent Spanish settlement called Ranchos de Taos. In 1760 Ranchos de Taos, also called Taos "Old Town", was attacked by Comanche Native Americans who took 50 women from a fortified house, the home of the Vidalpando family, and killed the men of the settlement.

Spanish settlers of the Taos Valley moved into the Taos Pueblo for safety from attacks from Plains Indians. In 1772 a mission church was begun. Between 1796 and 1797, land from the Don Fernando de Taos Land Grant was given to 63 Spanish families. In 1815 the San Francisco de Asis Mission Church was completed. The Taos region population grew as the result of land grants made by Mexico between 1821 and 1846.

Geography
Ranchos de Taos is located approximately four miles southwest of Taos.

Demographics

As of the census of 2000, there were 2,390 people, 984 households, and 619 families residing in the CDP. The population density was 705.9 people per square mile (272.2/km). There were 1,083 housing units at an average density of 319.9 per square mile (123.3/km). The racial makeup of the CDP was 62.34% White, 0.17% African American, 1.88% Native American, 0.46% Asian, 0.08% Pacific Islander, 31.97% from other races, and 3.10% from two or more races. Hispanic or Latino of any race were 75.31% of the population.

There were 984 households, out of which 32.8% had children under the age of 18 living with them, 43.2% were married couples living together, 14.3% had a female householder with no husband present, and 37.0% were non-families. 30.3% of all households were made up of individuals, and 8.7% had someone living alone who was 65 years of age or older. The average household size was 2.43 and the average family size was 3.05.

In the CDP, the population was spread out, with 25.8% under the age of 18, 7.5% from 18 to 24, 28.2% from 25 to 44, 26.7% from 45 to 64, and 11.8% who were 65 years of age or older. The median age was 37 years. For every 100 females, there were 91.5 males. For every 100 females age 18 and over, there were 89.6 males.

The median income for a household in the CDP was $28,750, and the median income for a family was $32,045. Males had a median income of $23,750 versus $18,382 for females. The per capita income for the CDP was $20,988. About 13.8% of families and 15.2% of the population were below the poverty line, including 22.6% of those under age 18 and 4.7% of those age 65 or over.

Education
It is within Taos Municipal Schools, which operates Ranchos Elementary School in the community. Its secondary schools were Taos Middle School and Taos High School.

See also

 List of census-designated places in New Mexico
 High Road to Taos, New Mexico

References

Further reading

External links

Census-designated places in Taos County, New Mexico
Census-designated places in New Mexico
Spanish mission settlements in North America